Lieutenant General Sir Henry Royds Pownall,  (19 November 1887 – 10 June 1961) was a senior British Army officer who held several important command and staff appointments during the Second World War. In particular, he was chief of staff to the British Expeditionary Force (BEF) in France and Belgium until the fall of France in May 1940. He was later chief of staff to General Archibald Wavell until the Battle of Singapore in 1942, and chief of staff to Lord Louis Mountbatten in 1943–44.

Early career
Pownall was born on 19 November 1887 and received his education at Rugby School and Royal Military Academy, Woolwich. After graduating he began his military service with the Royal Field Artillery and Royal Horse Artillery, during which he was stationed in both Britain and India 1906–1914. In 1909 he was promoted to lieutenant, and then captain in 1914.

First World War
During the First World War, Pownall served in both France and Belgium. He was promoted to major in 1917 and oversaw the Royal Artillery, 17th Division. For his service during the war Pownall was awarded the Distinguished Service Order in 1918.

Interbellum
Following the war, Pownall attended the Staff College, Camberley from 1920 to 1921, and then served as a brigade major at the School of Artillery in Larkhill from 1924 to 1925. He continued his training and education as General Staff Officer (Grade 2) at the Staff College, Camberley from 1926 to 1929 where he became a brevet lieutenant colonel in 1928. After completing his training at Staff College he took part in Great Game operations in the North West Frontier of India through 1931.

He attended the Imperial Defence College in 1932, and, following this, he held a series of staff appointments, serving as the Military Assistant Secretary for the Committee of Imperial Defence from 1933 to 1935, then as Deputy Secretary for the Committee of Imperial Defence in 1936. From 1936 to 1938, he was Commandant of the Royal School of Artillery. As the threat of war grew, he was Director of Military Operations and Intelligence in the War Office from 1938 to 1939.

Second World War

Britain entered the war after Germany invaded Poland on 1 September 1939. Pownall held a series of command and senior staff positions throughout the war. He was appointed Chief of General Staff for the British Expeditionary Force (BEF) in France and Belgium until the fall of France in May 1940. He then assumed the position of inspector general for the recently created Home Guard and was Commander of British Troops in Northern Ireland, before being appointed the Vice Chief of the Imperial General Staff in the War Office in 1941.

He subsequently became commander-in-chief of the British Far East Command in South East Asia until 1942, when it was succeeded by the short-lived ABDACOM where he became chief of staff to General Sir Archibald Wavell. Afterwards he assumed the role of Commander-in-Chief, Ceylon from 1942 to 1943, and commander-in-chief of the Persia and Iraq theatres in 1943. Finally, he was appointed chief of staff to Vice Admiral Louis Mountbatten, the Supreme Commander of the Allied South East Asia Command from 1943 to 1944. After the conclusion of the war he retired from the British army in 1945.

During the war Pownall received the distinctions of Knight Commander of the Order of the British Empire in 1940 and Knight Commander of the Order of the Bath in 1945.

Death
Pownall died on 10 June 1961, aged 73.

Personal life
He married Mary Henderson in 1918, whose husband John Gray had been killed in action in 1916, and was stepfather to her son, Willoughby Gray.

Post war positions
 Chairman, Friary Meux Limited
 Member of the Committee of Lloyds Bank
 Chief Commissioner, St. John Ambulance Brigade, 1947–1949
 Military consultant to Winston Churchill on The Second World War (Cassell, London, 1948–1954)
 Chancellor, Order of St John, 1951

References

Further reading 
Henry Pownall's diaries were published as Chief of Staff. The Diaries of Lieutenant-General Sir Henry Pownall, edited by Brian Bond (Leo Cooper, London, 1972)

External links 
Biography of Lieutenant General Sir Henry Royds POWNALL
British Army Officers 1939–1945
Generals of World War II
POWNALL, Lt Gen Sir Henry Royds (1887-1961) at Liddell Hart Military Archives

|-

|-

|-

1887 births
1961 deaths
People educated at Rugby School
Graduates of the Royal Military Academy, Woolwich
Royal Artillery officers
British Army personnel of World War I
British Army generals of World War II
Military of Singapore under British rule
Knights Commander of the Order of the British Empire
Companions of the Distinguished Service Order
Knights Commander of the Order of the Bath
Recipients of the Military Cross
Graduates of the Staff College, Camberley
War Office personnel in World War II
Graduates of the Royal College of Defence Studies
Military personnel from London
Academics of the Staff College, Camberley
British Army lieutenant generals
British military attachés
British people in colonial India